This article lists the chapters of Sigma Nu fraternity. They are listed by school name, along with the chapter's Greek-letter designation and the year in which it was first chartered.

Note that for Sigma Nu chapters, the Greek letter order does not necessarily indicate the order in which the chapters were founded; for example, both Mu and Theta chapters are older than Delta chapter. Some chapters listed (including Virginia Military Institute's Alpha) are no longer active in the fraternity.

Also listed are the years the chapter has won the Rock Chapter Award (the highest award a Sigma Nu chapter can receive), the Pursuit of Excellence Award (recognized the top ten chapters between 2003 and 2008; currently recognizes any chapter receiving an overall level of excellence in any of the three standard areas:  Values Based Leadership, Personal Development and Membership Value, and Operational Excellence), the LEAD Chapter of the Year award for the LEAD program, and the Gallaher Cup (the highest chapter GPA).

Notes

References

Sigma Nu
Sigma Nu